Ochsner is a German surname. Notable people with the surname include:

 Alton Ochsner (1896–1981), American surgeon and medical researcher who founded the Ochsner Foundation Hospital
 Jeffrey Karl Ochsner (born 1950), American architect, architectural historian, and academic
 Willifrank Ochsner (1899–1990), German general

See also
 Ochsner Health System, a not-for-profit health care provider based in Louisiana
 Ochsner Baptist Medical Center, a hospital in New Orleans, Louisiana
 Ochsner Medical Center, a hospital in Jefferson, Louisiana
 Ochsner Medical Center - Kenner, a hospital in Kenner, Louisiana
 Ochsner Medical Center - West Bank, a hospital in Gretna, Louisiana
 Patent Ochsner, one of Switzerland's best-known rock bands

German-language surnames